HP OmniBook was a range of laptop personal computers created by Hewlett-Packard, introduced in 1993. The range was discontinued following the acquisition of Compaq by Hewlett-Packard in 2002, with the Compaq Presario, HP Compaq, and HP Pavilion laptops succeeding the OmniBook line.

Models

 OmniBook 300 (F1030A/F1031A/F1032A)
 OmniBook 425 (F1033A/F1034A/F1036A)
 OmniBook 430 (F1035A/F1037A/F1038A)
 OmniBook 500
 OmniBook 510
 OmniBook 530
 OmniBook 600
 OmniBook 800
 OmniBook 900
 OmniBook 2000
 OmniBook 2100
 OmniBook 3000
 OmniBook 4000
 OmniBook 4150
 OmniBook 4400
 OmniBook 4500
 OmniBook 5000
 OmniBook 5500
 OmniBook 5700
 OmniBook 6000
 OmniBook 6100
 OmniBook 6200
 OmniBook 7000
 OmniBook 7100
 OmniBook XE2
 OmniBook XE3

Notable models

OmniBook 300

The HP OmniBook 300 (OB300) is a "superportable" laptop released in 1993 as one of the first notebook computers in the OmniBook line. It weighed only 2.9 pounds and measured 1.4 × 6.4 × 11.1 inches. It is powered by an Intel 386SXLV processor, featured a full-size keyboard, a pop-up mouse (The same pop-up mouse was also used in Omnibook 800CT), and a 9-inch VGA screen. Due to storage limitations, the OmniBook 300 included both Microsoft Excel and Microsoft Word pre-installed in ROM, which was and still remains unusual to this day. It had two PCMCIA slots for additional memory, modem, network cards or other peripherals. One of its outstanding features was a technology known as "Instant On". It was sold in three storage configurations: no mass storage (F1030A at ), 10MB flash memory disk (F1031A at ), or 40MB hard drive (F1032A at ). Compared to the hard drive, the flash memory disk reduced the weight and storage capacity but increased battery life. It came with slimmed-down copies of MS-DOS 5.0 and Windows 3.1. The "International English" version of the OmniBook 300 used code page 850 (rather than the more common code page 437) as hardware code page.

See also
HP OmniGo
 HP Pavilion
 Compaq Presario

References

External links 
Official HP pages
    OmniBook search results on HP's website
OmniBook support page, with more extensive list of models here 

Others
 HP Omnibook Information  - by Kieran Garbutt
 HP Omnibook site by Sean McCreary

HP subnotebooks
Discontinued products